Carle or Charles-André van Loo (15 February 1705 – 15 July 1765) was a French painter, son of the painter Louis-Abraham van Loo, a younger brother of Jean-Baptiste van Loo and grandson of Jacob van Loo. He was the most famous member of a successful dynasty of painters of Dutch origin. His oeuvre includes every category: religion, history painting, mythology, portraiture, allegory, and genre scenes.

Life

He was born in Nice, then part of the Duchy of Savoy. Van Loo followed his brother Jean-Baptiste to Turin, and then to Rome in 1712, where he studied under Benedetto Luti and the sculptor Pierre Le Gros. After leaving Italy in 1723, he worked in Paris, studied at the Académie Royale, where he gained first prize for drawing in 1723, and received the first prize for historical painting in 1727—as did his future rival François Boucher. In 1724 he won the Prix de Rome.

After again visiting Turin in 1727, he was employed by king Victor Amadeus II of Sardinia, for whom he painted a series of subjects illustrative of Torquato Tasso. In 1734 he settled in Paris, and in 1735 became a member of the Académie royale de peinture et de sculpture and rose rapidly in the hierarchy of the academy. Madame de Pompadour and the French court were taking the artist under their patronage. He was decorated with the Order of Saint Michael and named First Painter to king Louis XV of France in 1762. He was a most successful court painter but his portraits as well as history paintings also enjoyed an enormous success throughout all Europe. He died in Paris on 15 July 1765.

Work
By his simplicity of style and correctness of design, the result of his study of the great Italian masters, he did much to purify the modern French school; but the praise that was later lavished upon his productions now appears undue and excessive. His patrons included members of the court, the Gobelins factory, private individuals, and the church. In the ensuing centuries, Van Loo's critical fortune has plummeted, although his ability remains admirable, and the quality and variety of his work command respect. His Marriage of the Virgin is preserved in the Louvre.

Paintings

References

External links

1705 births
1765 deaths
18th-century French painters
French male painters
Orientalist painters
Prix de Rome for painting
Premiers peintres du Roi
18th-century French male artists